The 2000 Ozemail Queensland 500 was an endurance race for V8 Supercars. It was held at the Queensland Raceway, near Ipswich, in Queensland, Australia on 10 September 2000. The race was staged over 161 laps of the 3.12 kilometre circuit, a total distance of 502 kilometres. It was Round 11 of the 2000 Shell Championship Series and was the second Queensland 500.

Top ten shootout

Results
Results as follows:

Statistics
 Provisional Pole Position - #11 Russell Ingall - 1:10.1840
 Pole Position - #34 Garth Tander - 1:10.3858
 Fastest Lap - #5 Glenn Seton - 1:11.4455
 Average Speed - 146.61 km/h

References

Further reading
 Auto Action, 15–21 September 2000, pages 21–24

External links
 Official race results
 Official V8 Supercar website

Ozemail Queensland 500
Queensland 500
Pre-Bathurst 500